The Arkansas State Archives, or State Archives for short and abbreviated as ASA, is an agency of the Division of Arkansas Heritage responsible for the preservation of state government and historical records. It is also tasked with increasing public access to those documents which make up the State Archive.

The State Archives also serves as the Arkansas Historical Advisory Board to assist public and private nonprofit organizations throughout the state in the acquisition, preservation and use of records of enduring value. The board receives, reviews, and makes recommendations on grant applications to fund state historical records projects through the National Historical Publications and Records Commission, the grant-making affiliate of the National Archives and Records Administration.

History 
The Arkansas General Assembly established the Arkansas History Commission through the Act of 1905 signed by Governor Jeff Davis on April 27. Aligned with Department of Parks and Tourism since 1971, it was transferred to the Department of Arkansas Heritage on July 1, 2016, and renamed Arkansas State Archives.

Headquarters 
Located at 1 Capitol Mall, Suite 215 in Little Rock, Arkansas, just behind the state capitol, the State Archives is headed by the State Historian. Beneath the agency are two subordinate regional archives: the Northeast Arkansas Regional Archives at Powhatan and the Southwest Arkansas Regional Archives at Washington.

See also 
 List of U.S. state libraries and archives
 National Archives and Records Administration

References

External links 

 
 Arkansas Digital Archives
 Friends of the Arkansas State Archives

1905 establishments in Arkansas
1905 in American law
Government agencies established in 1905
Organizations based in Little Rock, Arkansas
Open government in the United States
Photo archives in the United States
Research libraries in the United States
State agencies of Arkansas
State archives of the United States
Tourist attractions in Little Rock, Arkansas